Stefan Ertl (born 21 April 1969) is a retired German football player. He spent two seasons in the Bundesliga with Borussia Mönchengladbach and 1. FC Kaiserslautern.

Honours
 Bundesliga champion: 1997–98

References

External links
 

1969 births
Living people
Association football midfielders
German footballers
Borussia Mönchengladbach players
SC Fortuna Köln players
1. FC Kaiserslautern II players
1. FC Kaiserslautern players
Kickers Offenbach players
Karlsruher SC players
Bundesliga players
2. Bundesliga players
German football managers
Wormatia Worms managers